Allelon Ruggiero (born March 5, 1971) is an American actor and director. He is best known for playing the character Stephen Meeks in Dead Poets Society.

Early life
Ruggiero was born in Philadelphia, Pennsylvania. He attended the Philadelphia High School for the Creative and Performing Arts, and later the University of the Arts in Philadelphia.

Acting 
After making his debut in Peter Weir's film, Ruggiero had minor roles in movies like 12 Monkeys and The Mirror Has Two Faces. He appeared as the guest lead in "Intolerance", the 42nd episode of Law & Order (season 2) and had a lead role in the comedy horror movie, The Greenskeeper. In 2004, Ruggiero began a break of nine years from acting, until he began acting again in 2013 for an episode on The Bullsh*t Detective.

Directing
In 1995, Ruggiero wrote, directed, and acted in a short film entitled "Lost", which screened at the Museum of American Art and took a third-place prize in its category at the 1997 Denver Film Festival.
During his acting hiatus, Ruggiero ventured into directing and producing, making content for Bain & Company. Ruggiero and his wife, TV producer , opened Aeriform Arts, an aerial and circus arts training facility in Hollywood in 2011. In 2019, Ruggiero directed Cirque du Giselle, an aerial version of the classic ballet, during the Hollywood Fringe Festival.

Filmography

Television

References

External links

, directed by Allelon Ruggiero
, Allelon Ruggiero's thesis film

1971 births
American male film actors
American male television actors
Living people